Ranjesh Prakash (born 9 July 1989) in Vatulaulau, Ba, Fiji, is a Fiji Islands track and field athlete. He competes in sprinting for athletes with visual impairments (in the T13 category for partial blindness).

Prakash initially studied at the DAV College in Nabua, before studying at the Suva Blind School in Suva. He graduated from Fiji National University in 2013 with a Trade Diploma in Office Administration and now lives in Melbourne, Australia while he studies at Australian Catholic University. 

In the FESPIC Games of 2006 in Kuala Lumpur, he won bronze in the 200 metre event. He also won a bronze medal at the Arafura Games in Darwin, in 2007.

Prakash was Fiji's flagbearer and sole representative at the 2008 Summer Paralympics in Beijing, where he competed in the 100 metre sprint and finished in 23rd place out of 25 runners. It was his first participation in the Paralympic Games.

He planned on competing at the 2010 Commonwealth Games in Delhi, however, as Fiji was suspended from the Commonwealth, it was banned from participating in the Games.

Prakash went on to compete in the 2011 South Pacific Games held in Nouméa, New Caledonia where he won a bronze medal for the 100m Parasport Ambulant. 

His personal bests are 11.9 second in the 100 metres and 25 seconds in the 200 metres.

References 

1989 births
Living people
Fijian male sprinters
Paralympic athletes of Fiji
Athletes (track and field) at the 2008 Summer Paralympics
People from Ba Province
Fijian people of Indian descent
Fiji National University alumni
Athletes from Melbourne
Fijian expatriates in Australia
FESPIC Games competitors